Orocrambus paraxenus is a moth in the family Crambidae. It was described by Edward Meyrick in 1885. It is endemic to New Zealand, where it has been recorded from the South Island. The habitat this species prefers consists of dry tussock areas.

The wingspan is 30–33 mm. Adults have been recorded on wing from December to February.

References

Crambinae
Moths described in 1885
Moths of New Zealand
Endemic fauna of New Zealand
Taxa named by Edward Meyrick
Endemic moths of New Zealand